The Cleveland railway line is a suburban railway line extending  east-southeast from Brisbane, the state capital of Queensland, Australia. It is part of the Queensland Rail City network.

History

Following the opening of the Wooloongabba Branch railway line from Corinda to Stanley Street in South Brisbane in 1884, calls were made for extending the line to Cleveland to serve the developing farming area. A line was surveyed, and took an indirect route to avoid hilly country and to serve Fort Lytton, a gun emplacement at the south entrance to the Brisbane River, then the major defence installation for the city.

The line was opened to Manly in 1888 and extended to the first Cleveland station in 1889. An extension to the second Cleveland station opened in 1897, at which time the first Cleveland station was renamed West Cleveland (later Cleveland Central).

The initial constricted terminus at Stanley St was replaced by a dual track line to South Brisbane in 1891, and the Cleveland line connection to it was realigned to junction at Park Road railway station at that time.

An extension of the Cleveland railway line to Redland Bay and Mount Cotton was surveyed in 1889. The extension to Redland Bay was recommended by the Royal Commission into Public Works in 1922, but was never built.

Duplication on the line from Park Road began construction in 1910. The duplication was opened progressly with the Park Road to Murarrie section opening on 17 June 1912. Duplication from Hemmant to Manly opened on 8 December 1912. The remaining section between Hemmant and Murarrie was completed in 1913.

In 1960, the line from Lota to Cleveland was closed. The Redland Shire Council opposed the closure, and preserved the corridor.

The opening of the Merivale Bridge in 1978 connected the Cleveland (and Beenleigh) line to the Brisbane CBD, and the line was electrified in 1982.

The line beyond Lota was rebuilt to contemporary standards ( rail, maximum 1 in 50 (2%) grades and minimum  radius curves) and reopened on the original alignment to Thorneside in 1982 and the line was electrified in 1983.

The line was extended to the third Cleveland station (formerly Raby Bay) in 1987, reputedly to facilitate potential extension of the line to Redland Bay in the future, being electrified upon opening. The travel time of 46 minutes compares to the steam-era time of 82–86 minutes.

A third line was laid between Park Road and Lindum railway station in the 1990s as part of the Fisherman Islands line to provide a dedicated freight track to the Port of Brisbane, being dual gauge to connect to the Acacia Ridge freight Terminal and the Australian standard gauge rail network.

Line guide and services
Most services stop at all stations to Bowen Hills railway station. Service originate from Cleveland, or in the interpeak, Cannon Hill. The typical travel time between Cleveland and Brisbane City is approximately 56 minutes (to Central). During weekday peak times, a few services run express between Morningside and Manly stations, for faster travel times for commuters working in the Brisbane central business district. Prior to 2014, an afternoon service on school days only operated express between Cleveland and Buranda stations, stopping only at Thorneside, Manly and Lota.

Cleveland line services typically continue as Shorncliffe line services.

Passengers for/from the Beenleigh and Gold Coast lines can change at Park Road; Ipswich, Springfield and Rosewood lines at Roma Street; and Airport, Doomben and Northern lines (see list below) at Central.

References

External links
Queensland Rail
TransInfo

Brisbane railway lines
Public transport in Brisbane
3 ft 6 in gauge railways in Australia